Grégory Dubois (born 27 March 1975) is a French ice hockey player. He competed in the men's tournament at the 1998 Winter Olympics.

References

External links

1975 births
Living people
Anglet Hormadi Élite players
Corsaires de Dunkerque players
Gothiques d'Amiens players
Olympic ice hockey players of France
Ice hockey players at the 1998 Winter Olympics
Sportspeople from Dunkirk